Elmer is a borough in Salem County in the U.S. state of New Jersey. As of the 2020 United States census, the borough's population was 1,347, a decrease of 48 (−3.4%) from the 2010 census count of 1,395, which in turn reflected an increase of 11 (+0.8%) from the 1,384 counted in the 2000 census. It is the home of the annual Appel Farm Arts and Music Festival, which celebrated its 23rd year in 2012.

History
Elmer was incorporated as a borough by an act of the New Jersey Legislature on January 28, 1893, from portions of Pittsgrove Township and Upper Pittsgrove Township, based on the results of a referendum held four days earlier. The borough was named for Lucius Elmer a former judge who helped obtain a post office for the community during his service as Congressman.

Elmer is a dry town where alcohol is not permitted to be sold legally.

Geography
According to the United States Census Bureau, the borough had a total area of 0.91 square miles (2.37 km2), including 0.89 square miles (2.31 km2) of land and 0.02 square miles (0.05 km2) of water (2.20%).

The borough borders Pittsgrove Township and Upper Pittsgrove Township.

The borough is located on U.S. Route 40.

Demographics

2010 census

The Census Bureau's 2006–2010 American Community Survey showed that (in 2010 inflation-adjusted dollars) median household income was $65,417 (with a margin of error of +/− $8,616) and the median family income was $78,661 (+/− $5,812). Males had a median income of $51,685 (+/− $7,458) versus $41,042 (+/− $9,148) for females. The per capita income for the borough was $29,065 (+/− $2,585). About 7.8% of families and 6.5% of the population were below the poverty line, including 8.7% of those under age 18 and 6.8% of those age 65 or over.

2000 census
As of the 2000 United States census there were 1,384 people, 524 households, and 385 families residing in the borough. The racial makeup of the borough was 97.25% White, 0.65% African American, 0.51% Asian, 0.72% from other races, and 0.87% from two or more races. Hispanic or Latino of any race were 1.52% of the population.

There were 524 households, out of which 35.7% had children under the age of 18 living with them, 58.0% were married couples living together, 11.6% had a female householder with no husband present, and 26.5% were non-families. 22.3% of all households were made up of individuals, and 10.1% had someone living alone who was 65 years of age or older. The average household size was 2.61 and the average family size was 3.06.

In the borough the population was spread out, with 24.4% under the age of 18, 8.6% from 18 to 24, 29.8% from 25 to 44, 21.7% from 45 to 64, and 15.5% who were 65 years of age or older. The median age was 37 years. For every 100 females, there were 94.1 males. For every 100 females age 18 and over, there were 87.5 males.

The median income for a household in the borough was $46,172, and the median income for a family was $58,438. Males had a median income of $39,896 versus $27,583 for females. The per capita income for the borough was $21,356. About 4.6% of families and 5.3% of the population were below the poverty line, including 6.2% of those under age 18 and 3.3% of those age 65 or over.

Government

Local government
Elmer is governed under the Borough form of New Jersey municipal government, which is used in 218 municipalities (of the 564) statewide, making it the most common form of government in New Jersey. The governing body is comprised of the Mayor and the Borough Council, with all positions elected at-large on a partisan basis as part of the November general election. The Mayor is elected directly by the voters to a four-year term of office. The Borough Council is comprised of six members elected to serve three-year terms on a staggered basis, with two seats coming up for election each year in a three-year cycle. The Borough form of government used by Elmer is a "weak mayor / strong council" government in which council members act as the legislative body with the mayor presiding at meetings and voting only in the event of a tie. The mayor can veto ordinances subject to an override by a two-thirds majority vote of the council. The mayor makes committee and liaison assignments for council members, and most appointments are made by the mayor with the advice and consent of the council.

, the Mayor of Elmer Borough is Democrat Joseph P. Stemberger, whose term of office expires on December 31, 2023. Members of the Elmer Borough Council are Council President Lewis M. Schneider (R, 2024), Lynda Davis (R, 2022), Bruce Foster (R, 2023), Cynthia L. Nolan (R, 2023), Steven A. Schalick (R, 2022) and James W. Zee, III (R, 2024).

In February 2019, the Borough Council selected Bruce Foster from three candidates nominated by the Republican municipal committee to fill the seat expiring in December 2020 that became vacant following the resignation of R. Matthew Richards the previous month. Foster served on an interim basis until the November 2019 general election, when he was elected to serve the balance of the term of office.

Federal, state and county representation
Elmer is located in the 2nd Congressional District and is part of New Jersey's 3rd state legislative district.

 

Salem County is governed by a five-member Board of County Commissioners who are elected at-large to serve three-year terms of office on a staggered basis, with either one or two seats coming up for election each year. At an annual reorganization meeting held in the beginning of January, the board selects a Director and a Deputy Director from among its members. , Salem County's Commissioners (with party, residence and term-end year listed in parentheses) are 
Director Benjamin H. Laury (R, Elmer, term as commissioner ends December 31, 2024; term as director ends 2022), 
Deputy Director Gordon J. "Mickey" Ostrum, Jr. (R, Pilesgrove Township, term as commissioner ends 2024; term as deputy director ends 2022),  
R. Scott Griscom (R, Mannington Township, 2022), 
Edward A. Ramsay (R, Pittsgrove Township, 2023) and
Lee R. Ware (D, Elsinboro Township, 2022). Constitutional officers elected on a countywide basis are 
County Clerk Dale A. Cross (R, 2024),
Sheriff Charles M. Miller (R, 2024) and 
Surrogate Nicki A. Burke (D, 2023).

Politics
As of March 2011, there were a total of 852 registered voters in Elmer, of whom 201 (23.6% vs. 30.6% countywide) were registered as Democrats, 253 (29.7% vs. 21.0%) were registered as Republicans and 397 (46.6% vs. 48.4%) were registered as Unaffiliated. There was one voter registered to another party. Among the borough's 2010 Census population, 61.1% (vs. 64.6% in Salem County) were registered to vote, including 79.1% of those ages 18 and over (vs. 84.4% countywide).

In the 2012 presidential election, Republican Mitt Romney received 60.4% of the vote (356 cast), ahead of Democrat Barack Obama with 38.0% (224 votes), and other candidates with 1.5% (9 votes), among the 593 ballots cast by the borough's 875 registered voters (4 ballots were spoiled), for a turnout of 67.8%. In the 2008 presidential election, Republican John McCain received 375 votes (56.4% vs. 46.6% countywide), ahead of Democrat Barack Obama with 261 votes (39.2% vs. 50.4%) and other candidates with 15 votes (2.3% vs. 1.6%), among the 665 ballots cast by the borough's 892 registered voters, for a turnout of 74.6% (vs. 71.8% in Salem County). In the 2004 presidential election, Republican George W. Bush received 414 votes (62.4% vs. 52.5% countywide), ahead of Democrat John Kerry with 242 votes (36.5% vs. 45.9%) and other candidates with 5 votes (0.8% vs. 1.0%), among the 663 ballots cast by the borough's 904 registered voters, for a turnout of 73.3% (vs. 71.0% in the whole county).

In the 2013 gubernatorial election, Republican Chris Christie received 75.5% of the vote (329 cast), ahead of Democrat Barbara Buono with 21.8% (95 votes), and other candidates with 2.8% (12 votes), among the 440 ballots cast by the borough's 897 registered voters (4 ballots were spoiled), for a turnout of 49.1%. In the 2009 gubernatorial election, Republican Chris Christie received 234 votes (53.8% vs. 46.1% countywide), ahead of Democrat Jon Corzine with 155 votes (35.6% vs. 39.9%), Independent Chris Daggett with 38 votes (8.7% vs. 9.7%) and other candidates with 5 votes (1.1% vs. 2.0%), among the 435 ballots cast by the borough's 876 registered voters, yielding a 49.7% turnout (vs. 47.3% in the county).

Education
As of May 2010, Elmer students attend the schools of the Pittsgrove Township School District as part of a full sending/receiving relationship in which the former Elmer School is integrated into the district and Elmer and Pittsgrove Township students attend school together throughout their education.

As of the 2021–22 school year, the district, comprised of five schools, had an enrollment of 1,686 students and 138.7 classroom teachers (on an FTE basis), for a student–teacher ratio of 12.2:1. Schools in the district (with 2021–22 enrollment data from the National Center for Education Statistics) are 
Norma Elementary School with 97 students in grades PreK-K, 
Elmer Elementary School with 214 students in grades 1-2, 
Olivet Elementary School with 333 students in grades 3-5, 
Pittsgrove Township Middle School with 496 students in grades 6-8 and 
A.P. Schalick High School with 486 students in grades 9-12.

Transportation

U.S. Route 40 is the main highway serving Elmer.

Notable people

People who were born in, residents of, or otherwise closely associated with Elmer include:

 Todd Barranger (born 1968), professional golfer
 King Brady (1881–1947), MLB pitcher
 Mulford B. Foster (1888–1978), botanist known as the "Father of the Bromeliad"
 David Mixner (born 1946), civil rights activist and author
 Tiernny Wiltshire (born 1998), soccer forward for the Jamaica women's national team

References

External links

 Elmer Borough website
 Pittsgrove Township School District
 
 School Data for the Elmer School, National Center for Education Statistics

 
1893 establishments in New Jersey
Borough form of New Jersey government
Boroughs in Salem County, New Jersey
Populated places established in 1893